Shamika Cotton is an American actress from Cincinnati, Ohio. She is perhaps best known to television viewers as Michael Lee's drug-addicted mother Raylene Lee in the acclaimed HBO series The Wire.

Career
Born in Cincinnati, Ohio, Shamika Cotton graduated from Cincinnati's competitive School for Creative and Performing Arts. In 2006, Cotton appeared on the I Wanna Be A Soap Star reality series to good reviews, and her performances from the show were also highlighted on Entertainment Tonight.

In November, 2007, Cotton launched a weekly videocast on YouTube entitled the “Shamika Chronicles”, a series that follows her life and offers a realistic look at the daily life and work of an aspiring actress.

In 2019, Cotton briefly appeared on single episodes of six different television series, as well as a small part in the box office bomb The Sun Is Also a Star.

Filmography

Film/Movie

Television

References

External links

African-American actresses
American film actresses
American stage actresses
American television actresses
Actresses from Cincinnati
Living people
21st-century American actresses
Year of birth missing (living people)
21st-century African-American women
21st-century African-American people